Lady Noggs (also known as Lady Noggs: Peeress) is a 1920 British silent drama film directed by Sidney Morgan and starring Joan Morgan, George Bellamy and Yolande Duquette.

Cast
 Joan Morgan as Lady Noggs  
 George Bellamy as Lord Errington 
 Yolande Duquette as Miss Stetson  
 Arthur Lennard as Reverend Grieg 
 James Prior as Caldicott Beresford

References

Bibliography
 Low, Rachael. The History of the British Film 1918-1929. George Allen & Unwin, 1971.

External links
 

1920 films
British drama films
British silent feature films
Films directed by Sidney Morgan
1920 drama films
British black-and-white films
Films based on British novels
1920s English-language films
1920s British films
Silent drama films